Shyrodes is a genus of wrinkled bark beetles in the family Carabidae. There are at least two described species in Shyrodes.

Species
These two species belong to the genus Shyrodes:
 Shyrodes dohertyi (Grouvelle, 1903) (Myanmar)
 Shyrodes nakladali R.T. Bell & J.R. Bell, 2011 (China)

References

Rhysodinae